MASISA S.A. (BCS: MASISA) is a wood products' company headquartered in Chile with manufacturing operations in Chile, Argentina, Peru, Brazil, Venezuela, Mexico and the United States. Its manufactured products include solid wood, particleboard, medium-density fibreboard (MDF) and oriented strand board (OSB), as well as interior doors, mouldings and millwork. The company is currently the second-largest company of its sector, after Brazilian meu furebs Duratex.

External links
 Company International website
 North America website

Forest products companies
Companies formerly listed on the New York Stock Exchange
1920 establishments in Chile
Renewable resource companies established in 1920